Santa Cruz Shakespeare is an annual professional theatre festival in Santa Cruz, California, founded in 2014. Its predecessor, Shakespeare Santa Cruz, lost the financial support of its host and sponsor, the University of California, Santa Cruz in 2013. Members of the original company immediately began fundraising and raised enough money to relaunch the festival as an independent entity.

History 
Shakespeare Santa Cruz was founded in 1981 by Audrey Stanley and performed annually on the campus of the University of California, Santa Cruz (UCSC). Plays by Shakespeare (and others) were performed both indoors on the UCSC Theater Arts Mainstage and outdoors in the Sinsheimer-Stanley Festival Glen. Usually, the company's season ran from July to early September and presented three or four plays that ran concurrently in repertory. Over time, the company ran up deficits, which were paid by the University of California. In 2008, with California's budget crisis having resulted in reduced funding, the university could no longer afford to cover these debts. An agreement was reached that if the theater could raise $300,000, it could continue operation. Within 10 days of the agreement's announcement, over $400,000 was raised. However, claiming continuing financial problems, in 2013 the UCSC Arts Division dean announced that Shakespeare Santa Cruz would end after that year's winter holiday production.

Following this announcement, members of the theater company began a campaign to raise money to become an independent company. In December 2013, a new entity known as Shakespeare Play On was formed for this purpose, co-headed by Shakespeare Santa Cruz artistic director Marco Baricelli and actor/director Mike Ryan. An online platform for accepting donations was established with the Network for Good. By February 2014, they raised over $1 million (USD) through crowdfunding to continue on without the financial support of the university.  In March 2014, the new company changed its name to Santa Cruz Shakespeare. The New York Times referred to the company's rebirth as an "underdog success story."

For its inaugural season under its new arrangement, Santa Cruz Shakespeare presented As You Like It, The Merry Wives of Windsor, and The Beard of Avon in July and August 2014. All three shows were performed in the Sinsheimer-Stanley Festival Glen on UCSC's campus.

For the 2015 season Mike Ryan took over sole Artistic Director duties and the company announced productions of Much Ado About Nothing, Macbeth, and David Ives's adaptation of Pierre Corneille's The Liar.

For the 2016 season the company moved to a new purpose-built home in the Audrey Stanley Grove at Upper DeLaveaga Park in Santa Cruz.

Season history

 2014
 As You Like It
 The Merry Wives of Windsor
 The Beard of Avon (fringe production)
 2015
 Much Ado About Nothing
 Macbeth
 The Liar
 The Rover (fringe production)
 2016 (Inaugural season in the Audrey Stanley Grove at Upper DeLaveaga Park
 Hamlet
 A Midsummer Night's Dream
 Orlando (fringe production)
 2017
 Measure for Measure
 Two Gentlemen of Verona
 The 39 Steps
 Candide (fringe production)
2018
Love's Labour's Lost
Romeo and Juliet
Venus in Fur
Men I'm Not Married To (fringe production)
2019
Pride and Prejudice
The Comedy of Errors
The Winter's Tale
The Two Noble Kinsmen (fringe production)
2020
Henry VI Part I (Staged reading, performed via Zoom)
Henry VI Part II (Staged reading, performed via Zoom)
Henry VI Part III (Staged reading, performed via Zoom)
Richard III (Staged reading, performed via Zoom)
The originally planned Season was Postponed to 2021 due to the COVID-19 pandemic. Instead, SCS produced 4 plays as online staged readings with each play broken into multiple performances over a series of weeks.
2021
Troilus and Cressida (Staged reading, performed via Zoom)
The Agitators
RII an adaptation of Richard II (play)
 The ongoing COVID-19 pandemic once again impacted the season, leading to the further postponement of the plays originally planned for 2020. A Flea In Her Ear was replaced as the 3rd show.
2022
Twelfth Night
The Tempest
The Formula (World Premiere)
 Just Deserts (Fringe Production)

References

Bibliography

External links 
 
DeLaveaga Park at the City of Santa Cruz website

Shakespeare festivals in the United States
Tourist attractions in Santa Cruz County, California
2014 establishments in California
Theatre company production histories